The Cargill Curling Training Centre Icebreaker is an annual cashspiel, or curling tournament, that takes place in Manitoba. The Event has been a part of the World Curling Tour since 2017. The 2016 event was known as the 2016 Performance Spider Midweek Special and was held in Waterloo, Ontario and was only part of the Ontario Curling Tour. The 2016 event included both genders, and in 2017 a separate women's event was added. Both the 2017 and 2018 events were held at the Granite Curling Club in Winnipeg. The 2017 event was known as the Spider Performance Icebreaker At The Granite and in 2018 it was known as the GOLDLINE Icebreaker At The Granite. Beginning in 2019 the event is being held at the Morris Curling Club in Morris, Manitoba.

Past champions

Men

Women

References

External links

World Curling Tour events
Morris, Manitoba
Women's World Curling Tour events
Women's curling competitions in Canada
Curling competitions in Manitoba